Seven Miles, occasionally referred to as Seven Miles El Progresso, is a village in the	Cayo District	of	central interior	Belize.	The village is in an agricultural region with the most frequent crops being citrus and banana.	It is one of 192 municipalities administrated at the village level in the country for census taking purposes.	The village had a population of	482	in 2010. This represents roughly	0.7	% of the district's total population. No census record was taken for the village in 2000.

The village is on karst plateau containing many caves. Barton Creek Cave underlies the village and its entrance is at the base of the cliffs.

References 

Populated places in Cayo District